LiberKey is a platform for freeware or free and open-source portable applications for Windows. It includes some unique features in the area of Portable Application Suites, like dedicated tools for portabilization (aka LiberKeyPortabilizer), portable file associations, portable desktop shortcuts and online updates of applications.

Compatibility
The majority of applications can run on almost any computer with Windows XP or later. Some applications will also run on all earlier versions of Microsoft Windows and under Linux using Wine.

Format
Applications available in LiberKey are packaged in a format referred to as ".lks" files, which are basically 7zip files packaging the application.
Each application usually has a complete separation from the data storage and the application executable directories to allow easy backup or synchronization of data.

LiberKey Menu
LiberKeyMenu provides complete control of the application suite, including access to LiberKey's auto update service which provides automatic updates to all applications installed via the LiberKey installer.

LiberKeyPortabilizer
LiberKeyPortabilizer is used to run applications in a "portabilized" context.

See also
Portable application
Portable application creators
List of portable software
Comparison of application launchers

References

External links

Computing websites
Portable software
Application launchers
Portable software suites